The ancient carnyx was a wind instrument of the Iron Age Celts, used between c. 200 BC and c. AD 200. It was a type of bronze trumpet with an elongated S shape, held so that the long straight central portion was vertical and the short mouthpiece end section and the much wider bell were horizontal in opposed directions. The bell was styled in the shape of an open-mouthed boar's, or other animal's, head.

It was used in warfare, probably to incite troops to battle and intimidate opponents, as Polybius recounts. The instrument's significant height allowed it to be heard over the heads of the participants in battles or ceremonies.

Etymology

The word carnyx is derived from the Gaulish root carn- or cern-, meaning 'antler' or 'horn,' and the same root of the name of the god, Cernunnos.

Archaeology

Symbolism 
In Iron age Britain, animal symbolism deliberately conveys aggressiveness and ferociousness, with examples including a boar on the Witham shield, the snouted deskford carnyx (Scotland) and the dragon pair sword scabbard (Thames river). 

There is  evidence to suggest that the carnyx would be held by a chieftain, as shown by a potential Gaulish king Bituitos figure.

Tintignac 
In 2004, archaeologists discovered a first-century-BC Gallic pit at Tintignac in Corrèze, France. The deposit contained more than 500 fragments of metal objects, including seven carnyces, one of which was nearly complete. Prior to this discovery, fragments of only five carnyces had been found, in modern-day Scotland, France, Germany, Romania and Switzerland. Four of the carnyces had boar's heads, the fifth appears to be a serpent-like monster; they appear to represent a ritual deposit dating to soon after the Roman conquest of Gaul. The Tintignac finds enabled some fragments found in northern Italy decades before to be identified in 2012 as coming from a carnyx.

Deskford 

The only example from the British Isles is the Deskford Carnyx, found at the farm of Leitchestown, Deskford, Banffshire, Scotland in 1816. Only the boar's head bell survives, also apparently placed as a ritual deposit.  It was donated to Banff Museum, and is now on loan from Aberdeenshire Museums Service to the Museum of Scotland. The location and age of the Deskford Carnyx suggests the instrument had a peaceful, ceremonial use and was not used only in warfare. Before 2004 this was the best surviving example, and generally copied in earlier reconstructions. The Deskford find was made almost entirely of brass, a metal used almost exclusively by the Romans, and strictly controlled by them. Further, the basic size and shape of the Deskford find suggests it may in fact have been a Roman military draco standard.

Roman archaeology 
Roman-struck coins suggest that a war trumpet was used by the Celts, which they called Carnyx. These celtic trumpets are dissimilar to Roman trumpets which are not described as having a "monster headed extremity". The Celtic or Gaulic carnyx was used by the Celts in a similar way to how a standard functioned for the Romans and there is an example of a Dragon headed carnyx in the base of Trajan's Column. The carnyx has been described as identical to a Dacian trumpet. There is a clear similarity between Gaulish carnyx and the Dacian La Tene dragon standard and jewellery with dragons and serpents. A dragon headed carnyx also appears to be held by a Gaulic woman on the breastplate of Augustus.

Others 

 The carnyx also appears on the side of the Gundestrup cauldron.
 A small bronze boar carnyx dating from the Iron Age was found in Suffolk, England in 2021.

Literature 
The name is known from textual sources, carnyces are reported from the Celtic attack on the Delphi in 279 BC, as well as from Julius Caesar's campaign in Gaul and Claudius' invasion of Britain. Diodorus Siculus around 60–30 BC said (Histories, 5.30):
Their trumpets again are of a peculiar barbarian kind; they blow into them and produce a harsh sound which suits the tumult of war.

Objects from Tintignac 
Objects found at Tintignac were exhibited at the 2012 exhibition "Les Gaulois, une expo renversante" (The Gauls, a stunning exhibition).

Other objects

Modern reconstructions

The reconstruction of the Deskford Carnyx was initiated by Dr. John Purser, and commenced in 1991 funded jointly by the Glenfiddich Living Scotland award and the National Museums of Scotland.  In addition to John Purser as musicologist, the team comprised the archaeologist Fraser Hunter, silversmith John Creed, and trombonist John Kenny.  After 2,000 years of silence the reconstructed Deskford Carnyx was unveiled at the National Museum of Scotland in April 1993.

In 1993 Kenny became the first person to play the carnyx in 2,000 years, and has since lectured and performed on the instrument internationally, in the concert hall, on radio, television, and film. There are numerous compositions for the carnyx and it is featured on seven CDs. On 15 March 2003 he performed solo to an audience of 65,000 in the Stade De France in Paris.

On 15 June 2017 "The Music of the Forest", a specially commissioned work by Lakeland composer, Christopher Gibbs, featuring a reconstructed carnyx, received its world premiere at Slaidburn Village Hall. The four-part song cycle evoked the landscape and history of the Forest of Bowland and was performed by the Renaissance Singers of Blackburn Cathedral under the direction of Samuel Hudson. The carnyx was played by John Kenny.

Gallery of reconstructions and reenactors

In popular culture
The carnyx is featured in the opening battle scene of Gladiator (2000); and is used as both a musical instrument and a fear-inducing weapon. It appears in several battle scenes of the French film, Druids (2001). A carnyx appears near the beginning of the 2012 Pixar computer animated film Brave. The carnyx is used in the Gallic soundtrack in Sid Meier's Civilization VI.

See also
 Dord (musical instrument), another type of Celtic trumpet which has been revived
 Lur
 Dacian Draco
 Kabura-ya

Notes

References
 Delmarre, Xavier (2003) Dictionnaire de la langue gauloise (2nd ed.) Paris: Editions Errance. 
 Hunter, Fraser (of Museum of Scotland), Carnyx and Co- piece by Hunter on the carnyx

External links

Ancient Celtic music in the Citizendium
Carnyx and co. Carnyx music.
Tintignac discoveries (in French, with photos)
Carnyx on a gold stater of Caesar and on a silver denarius, both from 48 BC
Rare Bardwell Iron Age trumpet sells for more than £4k

Brass instruments
Ancient Celtic metalwork
Celtic musical instruments
Pre-Norman Invasion musical instruments